Bern Elliott and the Fenmen were a British beat music group, active between 1961 and 1964, and best known for their 1963 cover version of the song, "Money".

Biography 
Bernard Michael Elliott was born in Erith, Kent, on 17 November 1942.  He attended Picardy School in Belvedere, before forming his own beat group, which became Bern Elliott and the Bluecaps before changing their name to become Bern Elliott and the Fenmen in 1961.  The group performed over the next two years in clubs in Hamburg, Germany, and were signed to a recording contract with Decca in early 1963. "Money" was released by several artists at the time, but Bern Elliott and the Fenmen were unique as a group in registering a UK Singles Chart Top 20 hit with the song in December 1963. Elliott and the Fenmen's Merseybeat style belied their southern England roots. However, they did appear on 13 March 1964 episode of the UK television programme Ready Steady Go!, playing their follow-up hit, "New Orleans".

In May 1964, Elliott parted company with The Fenmen, and utilised The Klan for a short time as his backing group on one release "Good Times" / "What Do You Want With My Baby" on Decca F11970, which was  released on 4 September 1964. The following year two further solo efforts, "Guess Who" and "Voodoo Woman", also failed to chart. The Fenmen continued, issuing further efforts both for Decca and CBS, including "I've Got Everything You Need, Babe" (1965) and "Rejected" (1966).

Led Zeppelin's Jimmy Page recalled:

After the Fenmen themselves disbanded, Wally Allen (aka Wally Waller) and Jon Povey moved on to The Pretty Things.

Lead guitarist Alan Judge died in 2017. Frontman Bern Elliott died from heart failure in Margate, Kent on 13 September 2022, at the age of 79.

Band members 
Bern Elliott – lead vocals (1942–2022)
Alan Judge – lead guitar (1942–2017)
Jon Povey – drums (born 1942)
Wally Allen – rhythm guitar (born 1944)
Eric Willmer – bass guitar (born 1942)

Discography

Singles 
"Money" (1963) – UK #14
"New Orleans" (1964) – UK #24

EPs 
Bern Elliott and the Fenmen (1964)
"Shake Sherry Shake" / "Please Mr. Postman" / "Shop Around" / "Mashed Potatoes” / “Chills" / "I Can Tell" (Decca) DFE 8561

References

External links 
 

Musical groups established in 1961
Musical groups disestablished in 1964
Decca Records artists
English pop music groups
English rock music groups
Beat groups
Musical quintets
1961 establishments in England